Bruno Guimarães Rodriguez Moura (born 16 November 1997) is a Brazilian professional footballer who plays as a central midfielder for  club Newcastle United and the Brazil national team.

Club career

Early career
Born in the neighborhood of São Cristóvão, Rio de Janeiro, Guimarães finished his formation with Audax. On 9 April 2015, aged just 17, he made his professional debut for the latter by playing the last three minutes in a 2–1 Campeonato Paulista away win against Bragantino.

Guimarães was promoted to the main squad in the 2017 campaign after impressing in the year's Copa São Paulo de Futebol Júnior.

Athletico Paranaense
On 11 May 2017, he joined Athletico Paranaense on loan until April 2018 and was initially assigned to the under-23 squad.

Guimarães made his Série A debut on 17 June 2017, coming on as a second-half substitute for Deivid in a 1–0 away defeat of Atlético Goianiense. The following 1 March, he was bought outright and signed a contract until 2021.

Guimarães scored his first senior goal on 10 March 2018, netting his team's fourth in a 7–1 home routing of Rio Branco-PR, for the year's Campeonato Paranaense. He then became an undisputed starter for the main squad under new manager Tiago Nunes. He renewed his contract until 2023 on 5 February 2019.

Lyon
On 29 January 2020, Guimarães signed with Ligue 1 side Lyon on a four-and-a-half-year contract. The transfer fee paid to Athletico Paranaense was reported as €20 million, who also secured a 20% sell-on clause.

Newcastle United
On 30 January 2022, Guimarães joined Premier League club Newcastle United on a four-and-a-half-year contract for a reported fee of up to £40m. He made his debut on 8 February as a late substitute in a 3–1 win against Everton. He scored his first goal for Newcastle with a "powerful back-heel volley" in a 2–1 victory at Southampton on 10 March, on his full debut game. He scored his first brace for Newcastle in a 2–1 victory against Leicester City on 17 April, with his second coming in the 95th minute, winning the game. On the 31 December 2022, Newcastle United held a moment of respect for the passing of the Brazilian footballer Pele. In respect to Pele, Guimarães wore the Brazilian national shirt.

International career
Guimarães was eligible to represent Spain before earning his senior cap for Brazil.

Guimarães featured for Brazil's under-23 team in the 2020 CONMEBOL Pre-Olympic Tournament. On 17 June 2021, he was named in the squad for the 2020 Summer Olympics.

In September 2020, Guimarães was called up to the senior Brazil squad for 2022 FIFA World Cup qualification matches against Bolivia and Peru on 9 and 13 October 2020, respectively. He had already been named in the Brazilian team call-up in March 2020, but that summoning was postponed in response to the COVID-19 pandemic. He debuted in a 2–0 away win over Uruguay on 17 November 2020.

On 7 November 2022, Guimarães was named in the squad for the 2022 FIFA World Cup.

Career statistics

Club

International

Scores and results list Brazil's goal tally first, score column indicates score after each Guimarães goal.

Honours
Athletico Paranaense
Copa do Brasil: 2019
Campeonato Paranaense: 2018
Copa Sudamericana: 2018
J.League Cup / Copa Sudamericana Championship: 2019

Lyon
Coupe de la Ligue runner-up: 2019–20

Newcastle United
EFL Cup runner-up: 2022–23

Brazil U23
Summer Olympics: 2020

Individual
Campeonato Brasileiro Série A Team of the Year: 2019
CONMEBOL Pre-Olympic Tournament Best Player: 2020

References

External links

 OL profile
 
 

1997 births
Living people
Footballers from Rio de Janeiro (city)
Brazilian footballers
Association football midfielders
Grêmio Osasco Audax Esporte Clube players
Club Athletico Paranaense players
Olympique Lyonnais players
Newcastle United F.C. players
Campeonato Brasileiro Série A players
Ligue 1 players
Premier League players
Brazil youth international footballers
Brazil international footballers
2022 FIFA World Cup players
Olympic footballers of Brazil
Footballers at the 2020 Summer Olympics
Medalists at the 2020 Summer Olympics
Olympic gold medalists for Brazil
Olympic medalists in football
Brazilian expatriate footballers
Expatriate footballers in England
Expatriate footballers in France
Brazilian expatriate sportspeople in England
Brazilian expatriate sportspeople in France